Corona Line was refer to:
IRT Flushing Line, part of the New York City Subway
Corona Line (surface), bus, formerly streetcar transit line
Corona Line (shipping company), defunct shipping company operating on the Baltic Sea between 1992 and 1995
Corona Line (Colorado), former rail line over Corona Pass before the Moffat Tunnel was built
A spectral line in the Sun's corona due to highly ionized elements